Élisabeth - Ils sont tous nos enfants is a 2000 French film made for television, directed by Pasquale Squitieri. It stars Claudia Cardinale, Jean-Claude Brialy and Marion Corrales.

References

External links

2000 films
Films directed by Pasquale Squitieri
French television films
2000s French films